Live at Leeds is a live album by the Rolling Stones, released in 2012. It was recorded at Roundhay Park, Leeds on 25 July 1982. The album was released exclusively as a digital download through Google Music on 16 October 2012. The concert was the band's final show of their European Tour 1982 and was also the band's last live performance with band co-founder and pianist Ian Stewart.

The song list on this collection is nearly identical to that of Hampton Coliseum (Live 1981), another Rolling Stones live album released earlier in 2012 which documents a show from the 1981 U.S. leg of the same tour. This recording includes the song "Angie", which does not appear on the Hampton Coliseum recording, but misses two songs which appear on the Hampton album: "Waiting on a Friend" and "Let It Bleed".

The 2-CD/DVD, single DVD and SD Blu-ray for this concert was released on 9 November 2015 entitled, From the Vault – Live in Leeds 1982.

Track listing

Personnel 
The Rolling Stones
Mick Jagger – vocals, guitar
Keith Richards – guitar, backing vocals, lead vocal "Little T&A"
Ronnie Wood – guitar, backing vocals
Bill Wyman – bass
Charlie Watts – drums
Additional personnel
Ian Stewart – piano
Chuck Leavell – keyboards, backing vocals
Gene Barge – saxophone
Bobby Keys – saxophone

References 

2012 live albums
2015 video albums
Eagle Rock Entertainment live albums
Eagle Rock Entertainment video albums
Live video albums
The Rolling Stones live albums
The Rolling Stones video albums